Wilmar Arnoldi (born ) is a South African rugby union player for the  in the Pro14. His regular position is hooker.

References

South African rugby union players
Living people
1994 births
Rugby union players from Pretoria
Rugby union hookers
Griquas (rugby union) players
Leopards (rugby union) players
Cheetahs (rugby union) players
Free State Cheetahs players
Stormers players
AS Béziers Hérault players